The Circle was a lesbian journal collectively produced by the Sisters for Homophile Equality (SHE) in Wellington, New Zealand between December 1973 and 1986. The magazine was renamed Lesbian Feminist Circle in 1977, and continued to publish until 1986.

Circle, which was printed by Herstory Press, the country's first feminist and lesbian press, initially reprinted articles from international lesbian magazines; eventually the magazine's publishing collective began to write and collect historical, political and theoretical material with a New Zealand focus that was of interest to local lesbian feminists.

See also
 Lesbian literature
 List of lesbian periodicals
 LGBT New Zealand

References

 

1973 establishments in New Zealand
1986 disestablishments in New Zealand
Defunct magazines published in New Zealand
Feminism in New Zealand
Feminist magazines
Lesbian culture in Oceania
Lesbian feminist mass media
Lesbian history
Lesbian-related magazines
LGBT history in New Zealand
Magazines established in 1973
Magazines disestablished in 1986
Mass media in Wellington
Women's magazines published in New Zealand